Edward Ethan "Junior" Bryant Jr. (born January 16, 1971 in Omaha, Nebraska) is a former professional American football defensive lineman who played six seasons for the San Francisco 49ers. Bryant was signed by the 49ers as an undrafted free agent. He appeared in 83 total regular season games, all with San Francisco, during his nine-year career. He registered 13.5 sacks in the NFL. His career was cut short after sustaining a neck injury while playing in a game at St. Louis in 2000.

Junior Bryant played his high school football at Creighton Preparatory School.  There, his teams won three state titles.

References

1971 births
Living people
Sportspeople from Omaha, Nebraska
American football defensive linemen
Notre Dame Fighting Irish football players
San Francisco 49ers players